p Eridani is a binary star system in the constellation of Eridanus (the River) whose distance from the Sun is 26.7 light-years based upon parallax. It was found to be a double star in December 1825 by James Dunlop in Australia at his home at Paramatta, now spelt Parramatta. It is visible to the naked eye as a dim, orange-hued star.

This system consists of a pair of near identical K-type main-sequence stars with stellar classifications of K2V. Component A has visual magnitude 5.87, while component B is magnitude 5.76.


Naming 

The name "p Eridani", according to Nature, p. 589 (19 April 1883) has been "occasionally miscalled 6 Eridani, which would imply that it was one of Flamsteed's stars. Flamsteed, it is true has a star which he calls 6 Eridani.  The designated letter 'p' was attached to a star by Lacaille in the catalogue at the end of his Coelum Australe Stelliferum. The number '6' is merely borrowed from Bode."

The use of Bode numbers was commonly used in the early 19th century, but this antiquated system has now fallen into disuse for more than a century.

See also 
 List of star systems within 25–30 light-years

References

External links 
 

K-type main-sequence stars
Eridani, p
Binary stars
Eridanus (constellation)
Eridani, p
CD-56 00328
Eridani, 6
0066
010360/1
007751
0486/7